Ronald Dean Porter (July 27, 1945 - December 4, 2019) was a former American football player who played linebacker for seven seasons in the National Football League for the Baltimore Colts, Philadelphia Eagles, and Minnesota Vikings.

Porter graduated from Yuba City High School in 1963 and played college football at the University of Idaho in Moscow. He was a member of Phi Gamma Delta fraternity and majored in marketing.

Porter was a fifth round selection of the Colts in the 1967 NFL/AFL Draft, the 126th overall pick. He was a member of the 1968 Colts team that won the NFL Championship, but were upset in Super Bowl III.

References

External links
Yuba City High School Class of 1963
 

1945 births
Living people
People from Woburn, Massachusetts
Players of American football from Massachusetts
American football linebackers
Idaho Vandals football players
Baltimore Colts players
Philadelphia Eagles players
Minnesota Vikings players